Kahraba may refer to:
Al-Kahraba FC, an Iraqi football club in Baghdad
Kahrabaa Al-Hartha, an Iraqi football team in Basra
Kahrabaa Ismailia SC, an Egyptian football club in Ismailia
Kahraba Zouk, a Lebanese sports club in Kesrouan, Lebanon
Kahraba (footballer) (born 1994), Egyptian footballer